Paul Bernard (21 December 1898 – 4 May 1958) was a French actor. He appeared in thirty-five films, including A Friend Will Come Tonight  (1946).

Selected filmography
 The Mysteries of Paris (1922)
 Pension Mimosas (1935)
 The Phantom Gondola (1936)
 Bach the Detective (1936)
 Summer Light (1943)
 Voyage Without Hope (1943)
 Les Dames du Bois de Boulogne (1945)
 Girl with Grey Eyes (1945)
 Roger la Honte (1946)
 The Revenge of Roger (1946)
 A Friend Will Come Tonight (1946)
 Panic (Panique) (1947)
 The Damned (1947)
 Dark Sunday (1948)
 White Paws (1949)
 The Man Who Returns from Afar (1950)
 Mystery in Shanghai (1950)
 Darling Caroline (1951)

References

Bibliography
 Ulrike Siehlohr. Heroines Without Heroes: Reconstructing Female and National Identities in European Cinema, 1945-1951. A&C Black, 2000.

External links

People from Villeneuve-sur-Lot
1898 births
1958 deaths
French male silent film actors
20th-century French male actors
French male film actors